Tasneem Alsultan (born October 10, 1985) is a Saudi-American photographer, artist and speaker. Covering stories primarily for The New York Times and National Geographic she is particularly known for her work on gender and social issues in Saudi Arabia and the region. She is a member of the Rawiya women’s Middle Eastern photography collective. In 2019, she became a Catchlight, fellow and was voted the ‘Princess Noura University Award for Excellence’ in the Arts category. She has also received honorable mention for the Anja Niedringhaus Courage in Photojournalism. In 2020, she cofounded Ruwa Space, a platform to support visual creatives. and offer education and consultation across the Middle East & North Africa. Alsultan is the first Arab female to become a Canon ambassador.

Early life and career 
Tasneem was born in Tucson, Arizona, but completed the majority of early schooling in the U.K. She then returned to Saudi Arabia at the age of 16, earning her undergraduate degree at King Abdul Aziz University in Jeddah. She also holds a master's degree in social linguistics and anthropology from Portland State University. After graduating, she taught English courses at colleges in both the U.S. and Saudi Arabia until taking up documentary photography full-time. One of her most popular projects, "Saudi Tales of Love," explores the realities of marriage, divorce, and widowhood in Saudi Arabia through the eyes of Saudi women. Alsultan has mentioned that the project was partly influenced by her own personal experience with arranged marriage at the age of 17, which eventually ended in divorce.

Selected as one of the 10 grantees of the Arab Documentary Photography Program, funded by Magnum Foundation/ Prince Clause/ AFAC grant in 2015, she began working on her project Saudi Tales of Love which was published in Time’s Lightbox, and later exhibited in Paris Photo, PhotoKathmandu, and among the slideshow at Visa Pour L’Image, Perpignan in 2016. She is a finalist in the 2017 Sony World Photography Awards in Contemporary Issues. She soon joined Rawiya, the first all-female photography collective from the Middle East. In 2018 she joined the Canon Ambassador program as the program’s first Arab female photographer and was selected as one of the 12 recipients of the Joop Master Class, part of the World Press Photo, Netherlands. In 2019, Tasneem was selected as a recipients of the Catchlight Fellowship to continue her work on Saudi women.She has also received honorable mention for the Anja Niedringhaus Courage in Photojournalism. In 2021, AlSultan has Coproduced and co hosted Repicture podcast, she also photographed AlSunbula Company, and MDLBeast Sound Storm in Riyadh. In 2022, Tasneem has been involved in a couple of different activities, she joined as a judge for World Press Photo, and for Catchlight Fellowship. Later, she participated in the Lesson of Worth  L’Oreal Campaign 2022.
She was also a speaker at bothin London,United Kingdom, and in Vienna, Austria.
In Paris of that same year, Tasneem Presented at ARLES Live magazine, and was the Co Host and Organizer at the Diriyah .

Alsultan also has a personal photography business where she photographs Saudi weddings. In 2016, her wedding photography was profiled by National Geographic, where she stated that she has photographed more than 200 weddings in 21 countries. In April 2016, Tasneem was selected by the British Journal of Photography as one of the 16 emerging photographers to watch in 2016, and was later selected by PDN as one of the 30 photographers to watch in 2017. She has recently extended her social documentary photography to Kuwait, where she is currently working on a project that focuses on capturing the unique challenges facing LGBTQ individuals in the country.

Exhibitions 
2019
 [full room exhibiting Tasneem’s project And Then There Were Women] at the King Abdul Aziz center ITHRA

 Exhibited at Hafez Gallery Jeddah images of Jeddah, sponsored by the French Consulate

2018

 Solo exhibition; Saudi Tales of Love; East Wing Gallery, Dubai UAE
 Group exhibition: Through Her Eyes Photo Festival, Berlin, Germany

2017 
 "Saudi Tales of Love wins first prize in Contemporary Issues ‘Professional’ at the Sony World Photography Awards and exhibited in Somerset House, London, UK
 Photographing the Female, Focus Photo Festival, Sun Mill Studios Compound Lower Parel, Mumbai, India
 ‘Saudi Tales of Love’ Gulf Photo Plus, UAE
 Rawiya Photo Collective: ‘We Do Not Choose Our Dictators’, Fort Worth Contemporary Arts, Texas, USA
 Middle East now, Florence, Italy
 Rawiya Photo Collective: ‘We Do Not Choose Our Dictators’, Aperture, New York, USA
 La Quatrieme Image, Paris, France

2016 
 ‘Saudi Tales of Love’ Photo Kathmandu Festival 2016, Nepal
 Where Are We Now?, East Wing presentation at Paris Photo 2016
 Tbilisi Photo Festival, Georgia
 Slideshow at Visa Pour L’Image

References 

1985 births
Living people
People from Tucson, Arizona
King Abdulaziz University alumni
American women photographers
American activists
American photographers
21st-century American women